Roger Gaillard may refer to:

 Roger Gaillard (historian) (1923–2000), Haitian historian and novelist
  (1893–1970), French actor (The Threepenny Opera, La Chienne, Le Diable boiteux)
 Roger Gaillard (journalist) (1947–2010), Swiss writer, curator of museum Maison d'Ailleurs
  (1904–1947), Central Committee of the French Communist Party